Liolaemus sagei is a species of lizard in the family Iguanidae.  It is found in Argentina.

References

sagei
Lizards of South America
Reptiles of Argentina
Endemic fauna of Argentina
Reptiles described in 2003